"Six Feet Apart" is a song recorded by American country music singer Luke Combs. It was released on May 1, 2020 as a direct response to the COVID-19 pandemic and was added to the digital version of his second album, What You See Is What You Get. It was also later added to the deluxe version of the album, What You See Ain't Always What You Get. Combs wrote the song with Brent Cobb and Rob Snyder.

Content
Before the pandemic had hit, Combs was scheduled to meet with songwriters Brent Cobb and Rob Snyder on April 14 for a writing session. Combs said that all three of them had wanted to write a song about the COVID-19 pandemic but he was initially apprehensive because he thought the concept would be "too cheesy". Combs uploaded an acoustic version of the song to YouTube. After the video trended on that site, he performed it on the Grand Ole Opry. Combs then recorded a studio version and noted that during the recording session, everyone involved wore masks and was in a different room. The studio version of the song was officially sent to country radio on May 1, 2020. The song has a theme of missing major activities due to the pandemic, such as the arrival of the spring season and touring as a musician.

Charts

Weekly charts

Year-end charts

Certifications

References

2020 songs
2020 singles
Luke Combs songs
Songs written by Luke Combs
Columbia Records singles
Songs about the COVID-19 pandemic